Naqaab (English: Mask) is a 2007 Indian Hindi-language suspense thriller film directed by the famous duo Abbas–Mustan. The film reunites Akshaye Khanna and Bobby Deol after Humraaz in 2002, which was also directed by Abbas-Mustan. Additionally, the roles that Deol and Khanna played in this film are the opposite of what they played in Humraaz. Deol and Khanna played the antagonist and protagonist roles in this film, respectively, while they played the opposite roles in Humraaz. This is also the fourth collaboration of Deol and Abbas-Mustan. Also, former model Urvashi Sharma makes her film debut as the leading actress of the film. The story of the film is inspired by the Hollywood movie Dot the I.

Plot 
The story revolves around the life of Sophia (Urvashi Sharma) who lives in Goa. When she is stalked and then attacked by a rapist named Rakesh, Sophia re-locates to Dubai. Here she rents a room in a villa near Jumeirah Beach, owned by wealthy star Karan Oberoi (Bobby Deol). Six months later he proposes to her, and she accepts. Shortly before the marriage, she meets with an unemployed actor, Vicky Malhotra (Akshaye Khanna), and is attracted to him, but decides to go ahead and marry Karan. At the altar, she changes her mind, ditches him and decides to move in with Vicky. But things take a turn for the worse.

When Karan is embarrassed in front of everyone by being dumped at the altar, he commits suicide, and when Sophia finds out about this, she realises it was her fault that Karan is dead. Soon enough, it is revealed that it was actually Vicky's fault Karan died, because Vicky was hired by a film director named Rohit Shroff, who decided to make a film on Karan's life, and therefore was hired to enter Sophia's life. Sophia gets mad at Vicky, and insists on meeting Rohit Shroff. Vicky calls Rohit to the building. Rohit arrives, and it turns out that Karan is actually Rohit Shroff.

It is revealed that Rohit aka Karan was in need of money, and therefore he decided to make a film on Sophia's life, so he hired Vicky to enter her life and make her fall in love with him. Then he faked his suicide and that would be the ending of the film. It turns out he had hidden cameras in Sophia's home, and recorded all the intimate scenes between Vicky and her. Karan then convinces Vicky and Sophia that if they do not go along with the film, he would upload the intimate scenes of them on the internet, and turn them into porn-stars. Therefore, Vicky and Sophia let the movie release. After 3 months, at the premiere, Karan plans a publicity stunt by him getting shot by Vicky (with fake bullets), then getting up and revealing he is still alive.

However, nothing goes as planned. Vicky shoots Karan with the fake gun multiple times, but it turns out that the gun had real bullets, and Karan brutally dies. All the movie's staff are arrested. In custody, Vicky explains to the police officers that it was all supposed to be a publicity stunt, and they let him free. Vicky escapes from the police station, and all the blame goes on the film's associate producers as they had planned the stunt in the first place. Vicky arrives at the hospital and meets Sophia, where it is revealed that Sophia and Vicky have actually murdered Karan. Sophia changed the fake gun to a real one with real bullets for Vicky to shoot with.

In the end, the associate producers are trapped in jail. Sophia received Karan's wealth and property, and lives a rich lifestyle as she marries Vicky who is now a famous superstar due to the film Karan made, which turned out to be a blockbuster.

Cast 

 Bobby Deol as Karan Oberoi / Rohit Shroff
 Akshaye Khanna as Vikram Malhotra / Vicky
 Urvashi Sharma as Sophia D'Costa Malhotra / Sophie
 Vikas Kalantri as Siddharth Mishra (executive producer 1)
 Vishal Malhotra as Ronnie Chaturvedi (executive producer 2)
 Rajendranath Zutshi as Detective Sam
 Archana Puran Singh as TV Reporter
 Ganesh Yadav as ACP Mhatre, Goa Police

Response 
Naqaab received positive reviews. Critics were generally positive to the performances of the three lead actors. Taran Adarsh of Indiafm.com said "Naqaab belongs to Akshaye, who delivers yet another powerful performance. He's splendid, the real scene stealer, the soul of the enterprise. Bobby is relegated to the backseat in the first hour, but manages to make his presence felt in the second half. Urvashi Sharma gets a dream launch and she utilizes the golden opportunity completely." Bollywoodarchive.com said "Akshaye Khanna stands out most outstandingly. His chemistry with Urvashi is superb. Bobby Deol does his part well but offers nothing vulnerable. Newcomer Urvashi Sharma acts as if she has the experience of many films behind her."

Soundtrack 
The soundtrack of Naqaab was composed by Pritam. Lyrics were by Sameer. The song "Aungaa Khojaunga", sung by Javed Ali & Remix Version By Zubeen Garg was a big rage of 2007 and is heard even today. Songs are as follows -

References

External links
 

2007 films
2000s Hindi-language films
Films directed by Abbas–Mustan
Films featuring songs by Pritam
Films set in Dubai
Indian remakes of American films